Der Prinz von Pumpelonien is a German television series.

See also
List of German television series

External links
 

German television shows featuring puppetry
German children's television series
1991 German television series debuts
1991 German television series endings
German-language television shows
Das Erste original programming